Barbara Weinstein is a diver from Cincinnati, United States. 

At the 1973 Maccabiah Games in Israel, she won a gold medal in three metre diving.

She won a gold medal in platform diving at the 1979 Pan American Games and a bronze medal at the 1977 Summer Universiade.

She qualified for the 1980 U.S. Olympic team but did not compete due to the U.S. Olympic Committee's boycott of the 1980 Summer Olympics in Moscow, Russia. She was one of 461 athletes to receive a Congressional Gold Medal instead.

References

Year of birth missing (living people)
Living people
American female divers
Maccabiah Games competitors by sport
Competitors at the 1973 Maccabiah Games
Maccabiah Games gold medalists for Israel
Sportspeople from Michigan
Pan American Games gold medalists for the United States
Pan American Games medalists in diving
Divers at the 1979 Pan American Games
Universiade medalists in diving
Congressional Gold Medal recipients
Universiade bronze medalists for the United States
Medalists at the 1977 Summer Universiade
Medalists at the 1979 Pan American Games
21st-century American women